Craig Hutchinson (June 23, 1891 – February 1976) was an American director and screenwriter. He directed more than 80 films between 1915 and 1928.  He also wrote for 33 films between 1914 and 1927. He was born in Austin, Minnesota.

Selected filmography
 A Film Johnnie (1914)
 His Favourite Pastime (1914)
 Cruel, Cruel Love (1914)
 The Star Boarder (1914)
 Fatty and the Heiress (1914)
 Whose Zoo? (1918)
Dark and Cloudy (1919), wrote and directed

References

External links

1891 births
1976 deaths
People from Austin, Minnesota
American male screenwriters
Silent film directors
Film directors from Minnesota
Screenwriters from Minnesota
20th-century American male writers
20th-century American screenwriters